Libellulosoma minuta is a species of dragonfly in family Corduliidae. It is endemic to Madagascar.

References

Corduliidae
Insects of Madagascar
Taxonomy articles created by Polbot
Insects described in 1906